Bolaños may refer to:

Places 
 Bolaños, Jalisco, in town in Mexico.
 Bolaños Municipality, in Mexico.
 Bolaños River, in Mexico
 Bolaños de Calatrava, a city in Spain
 Bolaños de Campos, a municipality in Spain
 Tobías Bolaños International Airport, in Costa Rica

Other uses 
 Bolaños (surname)
 Bolaños Woodrat (family Cricetidae), a species of rodent in Mexico
 Ycuá Bolaños supermarket fire (2004), in Asunción, Paraguay

See also
 Bolaño (disambiguation) 
 Bolanos (disambiguation)